Antonio Jiménez Quiles (born 13 July 1934) is a Spanish former road cyclist. Professional from 1954 to 1963, he most notably finished 2nd overall at the 1955 Vuelta a España, while being the youngest competitor at 20 years old. He also won a stage of the 1958 Vuelta a España.

Major results

1955
 1st Stage 4b Vuelta a Levante
 1st Stage 2 GP Ayutamiento de Bilbao
 2nd Overall Vuelta a España
 2nd GP Goierri
 6th Overall Volta a Catalunya
1956
 1st Stage 3 Vuelta a Levante
 4th Overall Vuelta a Andalucía
1957
 1st  National Hill-climb Championships
 1st Stage 1 Gran Premio de la Bicicleta Eibarresa
 3rd Road race, National Road Championships
 4th Overall Vuelta a Andalucía
 5th Overall Volta a Catalunya
1959
 4th Trofeo Masferrer
1960
 1st  National Hill-climb Championships
1961
 1st Stage 9 Volta a Portugal

References

External links

1934 births
Living people
Sportspeople from Granada
Spanish male cyclists
Spanish Vuelta a España stage winners
Cyclists from Andalusia